Pedro Landero (born 19 October 1913, date of death unknown) was a Filipino weightlifter. He competed at the 1952 Summer Olympics and the 1956 Summer Olympics.

References

1913 births
Year of death missing
Filipino male weightlifters
Olympic weightlifters of the Philippines
Weightlifters at the 1952 Summer Olympics
Weightlifters at the 1956 Summer Olympics
Place of birth missing
Asian Games medalists in weightlifting
Weightlifters at the 1951 Asian Games
Medalists at the 1951 Asian Games
Asian Games bronze medalists for the Philippines
20th-century Filipino people